Moses R. Maddocks (November 13, 1833 – February 25, 1919) was an American politician who served as the Mayor of Seattle in 1873.

References

1833 births
1919 deaths
Mayors of Seattle
Washington (state) Republicans